Benjamín Villafañe (March 31, 1814 – June 6, 1893) was an Argentine military leader. Born in Tucuman, he fought against Juan Manuel de Rosas during the Argentine Civil War, and escaped to Bolivia after the death of Juan Lavalle. He returned to Buenos Aires after the defeat of Rosas in the battle of Caseros. He died in Jujuy.

1814 births
1893 deaths
Unitarianists (Argentina)
People from San Miguel de Tucumán